ANR So Far is the debut album by Miami, Florida indie band Awesome New Republic. The album was created from a combination of two albums ANR handmade while at the University of Miami, Witness Now the Birth of an Awesome New Republic and Courageous. ANR's debut was well received by critics including a 7.9/10 rating from Pitchfork Media who described the album as "loaded with great moments" and "fully formed and totally enjoyable."

Track listing 
 "Introducing" 
 "Wheels, No Engines"
 "2k3012"
 "Sneaky"
 "Going Down"
 "Kill South Beach Dead"
 "Dogs Barking"
 "Constant Surgery"
 "Post What?"
 "Dirge"
 "The Clap"
 "Son! Tyrant!"
 "Fearsome Father"
 "The Tape They Don't Want You To See"
 "10K (Reprise)"/ "Kit On Fire"

Credits 
Awesome New Republic
 Michael John Hancock – vocals, drums
 Brian Robertson – keys, vocals

References 

2005 debut albums
Awesome New Republic albums